The Red University Building (translit.: Chervonyi Korpus Kyivskoho Universytetu) is the principal and oldest 4-story building of the Kyiv University located at 60 Volodymyrska Street, in Kyiv, the capital of Ukraine. This building is a famous symbol of the Kyiv University and the Ukrainian fundamental higher educational system.

History 
It was constructed from 1837–1843 and was built in a late Classicism type construction, by architect with Italian origins Vincent I. Beretti working for the Russian Empire.
The walls of the building are painted red and the heads and bases of the columns are painted black, corresponding to the colors of the stripes on the Order of St. Vladimir (founded in 1782), as Kyiv University used to bear the name of this Order. The motto of the Order, "Benefit, honor and glory" became the motto of Kyiv University. Local tour guides sometime state that Tsar Nicholas II ordered the entire main building painted red in response to student conscription protests during World War I to remind students of blood spilled by Ukrainian soldiers. 
Built at the top of a hill, this building has significantly influenced Kyiv’s architectural layout in the 19th century.

Colloquially referred as Red Corps, the building was nearly hit by a rocket during the 2022 Russian Invasion of Ukraine, an event captured close-up by smartphone video.

External links 

 
 
 Головний корпус Національного університету — WWW Енциклопедія Києва in Wiki-Encyclopedia Kyiv

Buildings and structures in Kyiv
Volodymyrska Street

fi:Punainen yliopisto